D510 is a state road connecting D200 near Plovanija border crossing and D21 near Kaštel border crossing, as a part of a series of short roads connecting Kaštel border crossing and A9 motorway Umag interchange. The road is only 0.6 km long.

The road, as well as all other state roads in Croatia, is managed and maintained by Hrvatske ceste, state owned company.

Road junctions and populated areas

References

State roads in Croatia
Transport in Istria County